Gauss was a ship built in Germany specially for polar exploration, named after the mathematician and physical scientist Carl Friedrich Gauss. Purchased by Canada in 1904, the vessel was renamed CGS Arctic. As Arctic, the vessel made annual trips to the Canadian Arctic until 1925. The ship's fate is disputed among the sources, but all claim that by the mid-1920s, the vessel was out of service.

Ship construction

The ship was built by the Howaldtswerke-Deutsche Werft shipyard at Kiel at a cost of 500,000 marks. Launched on 2 April 1901 she was modelled on Fridtjof Nansen's ship Fram, and rigged as a barquentine.

Classed "A1" by Germanischer Lloyds, she was designed to carry 700 tons of stores, enough to make her self-sufficient for up to three years with a crew of 30 aboard. The hull was exceptionally strong, and the rudder and propeller were designed to be hoisted aboard for inspection or repairs.

Ship history

Between 1901 and 1903 Gauss explored the Antarctic in the Gauss expedition under the leadership of Erich von Drygalski.

In early 1904 the ship was purchased by the Canadian government under the advice of Joseph-Elzéar Bernier, who had surveyed the ship before the acquisition. The ship was renamed Arctic and under the command of Bernier she explored the Arctic Archipelago. Bernier and Arctic made annual expeditions to Canada's north. On 1 July 1909, Bernier, without government approval, claimed the entire area between Canada's eastern and western borders all the way to the North Pole. Bernier only left the ship during the First World War, returning to command Arctic again from 1922 to 1925. The vessel's end is not agreed upon. According to schiffe-und-mehr.com, Arctic was abandoned in 1925 and left to rot at her moorings. Maginley and Collin claim the vessel was broken up in 1926 while the Miramar Ship Index say the ship was abandoned in 1927.

See also
 List of Antarctic exploration ships from the Heroic Age, 1897–1922

Notes

References

Further reading

External links

 
 W.B. Wiegand Diary of a Voyage on the Arctic in 1912 at Dartmouth College Library

1901 ships
Exploration ships
Canadian Government Ship